This is a list of people executed in the United States in 2010. Forty-six people were executed in the United States in 2010. Seventeen of them were in the state of Texas. One (Teresa Wilson Bean Lewis) was female. One (Paul Warner Powell) was executed via electrocution and another (Ronnie Lee Gardner) was executed via firing squad.

List of people executed in the United States in 2010

Demographics

Executions in recent years

See also
 List of death row inmates in the United States
 List of most recent executions by jurisdiction
 List of people scheduled to be executed in the United States
 List of women executed in the United States since 1976

References

List of people executed in the United States
executed
People executed in the United States
2010
Executed in the United States in 2010